Shiola Creek is a stream in the U.S. state of Mississippi.

Shiola  is a name derived from the Choctaw language purported to mean "dry".

References

Rivers of Mississippi
Rivers of Leake County, Mississippi
Mississippi placenames of Native American origin